Saleilles is a commune in the Pyrénées-Orientales department in southern France.

Geography 
Saleilles is located in the canton of La Côte Sableuse and in the arrondissement of Perpignan.

History

Government and politics

Mayors

Population

Notable people 
 Mathieu Madénian (1976-): humorist, actor and columnist who grew up in Saleilles.

See also
Communes of the Pyrénées-Orientales department

References

Communes of Pyrénées-Orientales